Pit of Darkness is a 1961 British thriller film, directed by Lance Comfort and starring William Franklyn and Moira Redmond.  The film is an amnesia thriller dealing with a man's attempts to piece together a sequence of strange events in which he seems to have been involved during the time of which he has no memory, based on the novel To Dusty Death by Hugh McCutcheon.

Plot
Safe-designer Richard Logan (Franklyn) awakens late one evening on a patch of suburban waste ground. He has no idea how he got there. He returns home to wife Julie (Redmond) to apologise for being late from work. He is astonished to learn that he has been missing not for a few hours, but for three weeks. Furthermore, a troubling series of events has occurred during his absence. A supposedly foolproof safe which he installed in a customer's home has been cracked open with apparent ease. Items taken include cash and a world-famous diamond from East Africa. Alarmed by Richard's disappearance, Julie had hired a private detective to find him, but the detective was later found dead. Richard must now find a way to penetrate the amnesia that prevents him from recalling recent events.

After investigating, he becomes aware that he is trailed by a group of mysterious men who patronize a local nightclub called the Blue Baboon, which he and Julie decide to visit one evening. While there, in his confused mental state, Richard is constantly ceased by random and trivial occurences – a snatch of a popular song or a conversational nuance – which inexplicably strike a chord within him. He experiences mental flashbacks so fleeting they are over as quickly as they begin. These and other events lead him to wonder if he may have been involved in criminal activity with some of the nightclub's regulars. Later, Richard is lured to a cottage in the countryside. He enters and hears the tick-tick-ticking of a bomb about to go off. He runs from the house, a split-second ahead of the shock waves that result from the explosion. It is this episode that appears finally to jolt his memory, and he believes he has disovered what has transpired during the past three weeks.

Cast
 William Franklyn as Richard Logan
 Moira Redmond as Julie Logan
 Leonard Sachs as Clifton Conrad
 Bruno Barnabe as Bruno
 Nigel Green as Jonathan
 Bruce Beeby as Peter Mayhew
 Anthony Booth as Ted Melia
 Nanette Newman as Mary
 Humphrey Lestocq as Bill Underwood
 Jacqueline Jones as Mavis
 Michael Balfour as Fisher
 Ronnie Hall as the singer

External links 
 
 Pit of Darkness at BFI Film & TV Database

1961 films
1960s thriller films
British thriller films
Films directed by Lance Comfort
British black-and-white films
Films shot at Twickenham Film Studios
Films set in London
Films set in England
1960s English-language films
1960s British films